Gabriel Brown, known professionally as Bronze Avery, is an American pop singer-songwriter. He released his debut EP American Dream in 2015 under his birth name. Avery subsequently released several singles and EPs under his stage name, before releasing his debut full-length album, Softmetal in 2022.

Early life 
Gabriel Brown was born in Orlando, Florida to a military family. He grew up as a Navy brat and moved to Seattle, Virginia, Washington, D.C., and Atlanta before returning to Orlando after his parents' divorce. Avery came out as gay by mistake due to a shared family computer. Shows including A Shot at Love with Tila Tequila helped him feel more comfortable while in school.

Career 
Avery is a pop singer-songwriter. He released an EP, American Dream (2015) under his birth name Gabriel Brown. He started going by Bronze Avery to disambiguate himself from several others with the same name. In his earlier music, Avery avoided discussing his sexuality, but has now come to embrace LGBT+ themes. The single "Pressure" is the first song released under his name Bronze Avery. In a 2018 interview with Local Wolves, Avery expressed interest in collaborating with singers Raye and Mabel.

The Orlando nightclub shooting influenced him as a queer musician. He regularly patronized the Pulse nightclub but was in Nashville, Tennessee at the time of the shooting. Avery performed at Los Angeles Pride in 2019.

In 2019, Avery released a music video accompanying the single "Want 2". Shawn Binder was the director and Joe DeSantis was the cinematographer. In an interview with Billboard, Avery stated he does not want to be labeled as an rhythm and blues artist. In June 2019, Avery released the single "Spilling Out" with a music video.

Artistry 
Avery is a pop musician. His biggest influence is musician Charli XCX. He is inspired by performers including The Pussycat Dolls and Nelly Furtado, Tove Lo, Banks, and Lana Del Rey. He was influenced by Gwen Stefani's debut album, Love. Angel. Music. Baby. Early LGBT influences of Avery include George Michael and Simon Curtis.

Personal life 
Originally from Orlando, as of 2019, Avery is based in Los Angeles.

Discography

Extended plays

Singles

Remixes

References

External links
 

Living people
Year of birth missing (living people)
Singers from Orlando, Florida
African-American male singer-songwriters
American male pop singers
21st-century African-American male singers
American LGBT singers
American LGBT songwriters
Gay singers
LGBT African Americans
LGBT people from Florida
Gay songwriters
American gay musicians
21st-century American LGBT people
Singer-songwriters from Florida
American gay writers